Gavron is a surname. Notable people with the surname include:

Assaf Gavron (born 1968), Israeli writer, novelist, translator, musician, journalist and hi-tech worker
Hannah Gavron (1936–1965), Mandatory Palestine-born British sociologist
Nicky Gavron (born 1941),  British politician
Rafi Gavron (born 1989), English-American actor
Robert Gavron, Baron Gavron (1930–2015), British printing millionaire, philanthropist and a Labour life peer
Sarah Gavron (born  1970), British film director